Harvey Ross Ball (July 10, 1921 – April 12, 2001) was an American commercial artist. He is recognized as the designer of a popular smiley face graphic picture, which became an enduring and notable international icon. He never applied for a trademark for the iconic smiley image and only earned $45 for his efforts. Ball later founded the World Smile Foundation in 1999, a non-profit charitable trust that supports children's causes.

Early life 

Ball was born and raised in Worcester, Massachusetts, by his parents Ernest G. Ball and Christine ("Kitty") Ross Ball. Ball had five siblings, three younger by the names of Merrit, Virginia, and Raymond, and two older by the names of Jessie and Ernest Jr. During his time as a student at Worcester South High School, he became an apprentice to a local sign painter, and later attended the Worcester Art Museum School, where he studied fine arts.

State Mutual and the birth of the smiley 

After World War II, Ball worked for a local advertising firm until he started his own business, Harvey Ball Advertising, in 1959. He designed the smiley in 1963.

The State Mutual Life Assurance Company of Worcester, Massachusetts (now known as Hanover Insurance) had purchased Guarantee Mutual Company of Ohio. The merger resulted in low employee morale. In an attempt to solve this, Ball was employed in 1963 as a freelance artist, to come up with an image to increase morale. Ball started with a sunny-yellow circle containing a smile, however wasn't happy that it could be turned upside down to make a frown. By adding two eyes, he created a smiley face. The whole drawing took 10 minutes to complete, and earned him $45.

State Mutual had planned to hand out 100 button pins containing the design, however demand quickly soared. The aim was to get employees to smile while using the phone and doing other tasks. Research has since taken place confirming Ball's instincts. The buttons became popular, with orders being taken in lots of 10,000. More than 50 million smiley face buttons had been sold by 1971, and the smiley has been described as an international icon.

By 1971 the smiley face was everywhere, so Ball contacted patent attorneys, who told him the design was now in the public domain. Ball said: "It never bothered me. I figured if I make the world a little happier, OK, fine". Ball's son, Charles, is reported to have said his father never regretted not registering the copyright. Telegram & Gazette reported Charles Ball as saying "he was not a money-driven guy, he used to say, 'Hey, I can only eat one steak at a time, drive one car at a time.'"

Popularity of the smiley 

The phrase "Have a happy day" became associated with the smiley although it was not part of Ball's original design. Philadelphian brothers Bernard and Murray Spain designed and sold products with the phrase and logo in the early 1970s. They trademarked the combination and later changed the phrase to "Have a nice day", which itself has become a phrase in everyday use in North America.

The smiley was introduced to France in 1972 as a signal of a good news story in the newspaper France-Soir. Frenchman Franklin Loufrani used the image this way and made swift moves to trademark the image. As of 2013, the company turns over $100 million a year and became embroiled in a copyright dispute with Walmart over the image in the 1990s.

The BBC broadcast a radio documentary on February 4, 2012, called Smiley's People that covered the story of the smiley.

Promotion 

On July 18, 1998, around the 35th anniversary of the design's inception, Ball appeared at That's Entertainment to meet fans and sign smiley pins and art. At this appearance Ball was shown copies of the graphic novel Watchmen issue number 1, which featured a notorious image of a smiley face with a splatter of blood across it. Store Manager Ken Carson was quoted as saying Ball seemed amused to see it on the cover.

World Smile Foundation 

Ball founded the World Smile Foundation in 1999, a non-profit charitable trust that supports children's causes. The group licenses Smileys and organizes World Smile Day, which takes place on the first Friday of October each year and is a day dedicated to "good cheer and good works". The catchphrase for the day is: "Do an act of kindness – help one person smile."

Death and legacy 

Ball died on April 12, 2001, as a result of liver failure following a short illness. He was 79. He left behind his wife of 54 years, Winifred Trudell, and four children.

The land that was owned by the Ball family, off Granite Street in Worcester, was purchased by the City of Worcester in June 2007, with help from Mass Audubon and a $500,000 grant from the state Executive Office of Environmental Affairs' Division of Conservation Services.  This property links Mass Audubon's Broad Meadow Brook Sanctuary with the developing Blackstone River Bikeway. It is now known as the "Harvey Ball Conservation Area" and is home to the appropriately named "Smiley Face Trail".

Distinguishing features of Ball's smiley face 
A Harvey Ball smiley face can be identified by three distinguishing features: Narrow oval eyes (with the one on the right slightly larger than the one on the left), a bright sunny yellow color, and a mouth that is not a perfect arc, which has been claimed to be similar to a "Mona Lisa Mouth". The face has creases at the sides of the mouth, and the mouth is slightly off-center (with the right side a little higher than the left) and the right side of the mouth is slightly thicker than on the left.

References 

1921 births
2001 deaths
American advertising executives
Artists from Worcester, Massachusetts
Deaths from liver failure